Fissure Glacier is located in the U.S. state of Montana. The glacier is situated east of Lowary Peak in the Mission Range.

References

See also
 List of glaciers in the United States

Glaciers of Missoula County, Montana
Glaciers of Montana